Richlandtown is a borough in Bucks County, Pennsylvania, United States. The population was 1,260 at the 2020 census.

Geography
Richlandtown is located at  (40.473184, -75.321523). It is completely surrounded by Richland Township.

Demographics

As of the census of 2020, there were 1,260 people, 467 households, and 319 families residing in the borough. The population density was 4,839.7 people per square mile (1,981.5/km²). There were 467 housing units at an average density of 1,769.6 per square mile (696.5/km²). The racial makeup of the borough was 93.0% White, 5% African American, 0.47% Asian, 0.39% from other races, and 0.47% from two or more races. Hispanic or Latino of any race were 1.25% of the population.

There were 467 households, out of which 41.6% had children under the age of 18 living with them, 63.0% were married couples living together, 13.7% had a female householder with no husband present, and 25.8% were non-families. 22.1% of all households were made up of individuals, and 6.3% had someone living alone who was 65 years of age or older. The average household size was 2.70 and the average family size was 3.13.

In the borough the population was spread out, with 27.2% under the age of 18, 6.2% from 18 to 24, 32.6% from 25 to 44, 16.5% from 45 to 64, and 17.5% who were 65 years of age or older. The median age was 35 years. For every 100 females there were 87.0 males. For every 100 females age 18 and over, there were 78.6 males.

The median income for a household in the borough was $30,556, and the median income for a family was $70,035. Males had a median income of $31,974 versus $25,625 for females. The per capita income for the borough was $19,322. About 1.5% of families and 3.6% of the population were below the poverty line, including 0.9% of those under age 18 and 2.0% of those age 65 or over.

Government and politics

Legislators
State Representative Craig Staats, Republican, Pennsylvania House of Representatives, District 145
State Senator Bob Mensch, Republican, Pennsylvania Senate, District 24
US Representative Brian Fitzpatrick, Republican, Pennsylvania's 1st congressional district

Ecology

According to the A. W. Kuchler U.S. potential natural vegetation types, Richland would have a dominant vegetation type of Appalachian Oak (104) with a dominant vegetation form of Eastern Hardwood Forest (25). The spring bloom typically begins by April 13 and fall color usually peaks by October 27.

Education

Quakertown Community School District serves public school students in Richlandtown. Neidig Elementary School, in the borough of Quakertown, serves students in grades K-5. The Sixth Grade Center serves students in sixth grade, Strayer Middle School serves grades 7-8, and Quakertown Community High School serves grades 9-12.

Climate

According to the Köppen climate classification system, Richland has a hot-summer, Humid continental climate (Dfa). Dfa climates are characterized by at least one month having an average mean temperature ≤ , at least four months with an average mean temperature ≥ , at least one month with an average mean temperature ≥  and no significant precipitation difference between seasons. Although most summer days are slightly humid in Richland, episodes of heat and high humidity can occur with heat index values > . Episodes of extreme cold and wind can occur, with wind chill values < . Ice storms and large snowstorms depositing ≥  of snow occur once every few years, particularly during nor’easters from December through February.

Transportation

Pennsylvania Route 212 is the only numbered highway serving Richlandtown. It follows a southwest-northeast alignment via Main Street and Church Street across the southern portion of the borough.

References

Populated places established in 1804
Boroughs in Bucks County, Pennsylvania